Maiden Stakes is a 1928 collection of short stories by the English author Dornford Yates (Cecil William Mercer), first published in The Windsor Magazine.

Plot 
The book consists of mostly stand-alone short stories, plus one ("Letters Patent") which features the author's 'Berry' characters and references Yates' book Perishable Goods.

Background 
The stories were written for The Windsor Magazine. Most appeared individually before publication in book form, but the last four, including the "Letters Patent" story, appeared later.

Chapters  

"Childish Things" and "Aesop's Fable" appeared in The Saturday Evening Post editions of 27/06/1925 and 10/09/1927 respectively. "St Jeames" appeared in Ladies' Home Journal in August 1927.

Critical reception 
The book was written at a difficult time for Mercer, when relations between him and his wife Bettine were getting steadily worse. Nevertheless, the original dedication read "To the American girl who did me the lasting honour to become my wife."

References

Bibliography
 

1928 short story collections
Ward, Lock & Co. books
Short story collections by Dornford Yates